Elaine Morgan (born 1960, Cardiff) is a Welsh folk singer. She was a member of Dan Ar Braz's group L'Heritage des Celtes, and often sang lead vocals, either alone or jointly with Karen Matheson. Morgan and Matheson received much acclaim for their performance on the Breton-language song Diwanit Bugale, France's entry to the Eurovision Song Contest 1996. Formed her own folk-rock band Rose among Thorns together with her husband Derek and produced several albums throughout the nineties. Currently involved in the running of the Rumney Folk Club in Cardiff. Has also worked with members of Fairport Convention and featured with them at their annual Cropredy gathering.

Personal life
Elaine is the youngest of three sisters.

Discography
 1989: First Blush
 199x: Rose Among Thorns 
 199x: This Time It's Real
 199x: Butterfly Dreams
 1996: Highlights (compilation)
 2002: Shine On

External links
Official Website

1960 births
Date of birth missing (living people)
20th-century Welsh women singers
Eurovision Song Contest entrants of 1996
Eurovision Song Contest entrants for France
Living people
Singers from Cardiff
21st-century Welsh women singers